Víctor Ferreira may refer to:

 Víctor Ferreira (footballer) (born 1986), Paraguayan footballer
 Victor Ferreira (basketball) (born 1986), Dutch former basketball player

See also
 Victor Ferreyra (born 1964), Argentine former footballer